The AME-250 C1 was a motorcycle made by the Brazilian manufacturer Amazonas, manufactured in Manaus from 2006 to 2009. The engine looks similar to the one found in the BMW R1200C by general design, nevertheless sizes of practically all elements differ and the parts are not interchangeable.

References

External links
 Amazonas 250
 Amazonas 251 C Owner's Manual, Internet Archive

Amazonas 250
Cruiser motorcycles
Motorcycles introduced in 2006
Motorcycles powered by flat engines
Shaft drive motorcycles